The Croatian Party of Rights ( or HSP) is an extra-parliamentary nationalist political party in Croatia. The "right(s)" in the party's name refer to the legal and moral reasons that justify the independence and autonomy of Croatia. While the HSP has retained its old name, today it is a far-right party with an ethnocentric platform.

Founding
The HSP, along with other modern Croatian parties (such as Croatian Pure Party of Rights), claim legacy to the Party of Rights which was founded in 1861 and existed until 1929.

During the Croatian War of Independence (1991–1995)
A group of people restored Croatian Party of Rights on 25 February 1990. Dobroslav Paraga, the first president of the party acknowledged the historical bounds with the older Party of Rights. Soon, the party faced splits. Krešimir Pavelić, a former secretary of the party, became president of the new Croatian Democratic Party of Rights. Some other rights parties that claimed origin from old Party of Rights appeared. Croatian Party of Rights did not participate in the Croatian parliamentary election in 1990, which helped Croatian Democratic Union (HDZ) to win more votes.

HSP's political appeal and strength were at peak during the 1991–92 when Croatian Defence Forces, a military wing of the HSP, took heavy burden of defence of Croatia. Paraga was the champion of the Croatian will for freedom and independence. Paraga harshly and openly criticized Franjo Tudjman for his cooperation with Serbia and the conflict with Bosniaks in Bosnia and Herzegovina. The HSP used the writings of Ante Starčević and the writings of Ustaša ideologues such as Mile Budak to argue that Tudjman was not radical enough in his defence of the Croatian state.

The ruling HDZ cooperated with the HSP until the fall of Vukovar, after which the leaders of the HSP and HOS were imprisoned for "terrorist activities" and "obstruction of democratically elected government". Paraga and the Croatian Party of Rights appeared in front of a military tribunal on allegations of insubordination. They were later released. Paraga's main political and electoral platform was the creation of a Greater Croatia and the total defeat of the Serbian aggressor. In the Croatian parliamentary election held in 1992, HDZ lost 7% of votes in favor of the Party of Rights.

One of the party's first post-communist leaders, Ante Paradžik was a political dissident during the former Yugoslavia when he was a student leader of the Croatian Spring, but he was killed during the war by assassination. Paraga found himself in a power struggle with his deputy, Anto Đapić. Paraga and Đapić fought a legal battle for the right to use the party name, a dispute that Paraga eventually lost. Paraga later formed the Croatian Party of Rights 1861 (HSP 1861) but by this time he was already politically marginalized.

On 17 September 1993, the leaders of the three rights parties held a meeting in Kutina and began preparations for a new union on a broad common rights program. The initiative for the meeting came from the new leaders of the HSP, Anto Đapić and Boris Kandare, who invited leaders of the Croatian Pure Party of Rights and the Croatian National Democratic League but the meeting was unsuccessful, and those parties are still acting separately. During the parliamentary election in 1995, HSP lost popularity due to bad situation in the party in favor of HDZ.

Post Croatian War of Independence

The long-time president of modern HSP was Anto Đapić. His political reputation was severely tarnished after the media found out that he cheated to obtain his first post-graduate degree in law at the University of Split, in collusion with Boris Kandare, a senior member of his party and professor at the Law Faculty. He was also publicly accused of faking injuries to obtain the status of a war veteran. Despite these revelations, Đapić's career as head of the HSP was unaffected. Even after the party was left by many and it had terrible results (losing seven out of eight seats from 2003) on the Croatian elections in 2007, he remained as head of the party (he temporarily resigned, but in less than few weeks he has withdrawn his resignation).

At the 2003 Croatian parliamentary election, the party – in an alliance with Međimurje Party (Međimurska stranka), Zagorje Democratic Party (Zagorska demokratska stranka) and non-partisan Slaven Letica – won 6.4% of the popular vote and 8 out of 151 seats, all for the HSP and Slaven Letica.

In August 2005, the Croatian Democratic Republican Party, a right-wing political party established on 21 October 2000, by merger of three smaller right-wing parties, merged into the Croatian Party of Rights.

The first president of HDRS was Joško Kovač. In September 2007, prominent members Miroslav Rožić and Tonči Tadić left the party. In November at the 2007 Croatian parliamentary election, the party suffered a setback, as it won 3.5% of the popular vote and a single seat in Sabor. After the 2009 Croatian local elections, which weren't particularly successful for the party either, turmoil in the party leadership escalated when a faction led by former representatives Ruža Tomašić and Pero Kovačević formed a splinter "Croatian Party of Rights dr. Ante Starčević".

At the party convention held on 7 November 2009, Đapić officially stepped down, allowing a new leader to be elected by party members. Daniel Srb defeated two other candidates to become the new president of the party.
Croatian Party of Rights announced that during the Croatian parliamentary election in 2011 holders of their list in VII Electoral District (primary Lika and Gorski Kotar) would be exclusively women.

The party, for the first time, didn't win any parliamentary seats in the 2011 Croatian parliamentary election, which led to a crisis in Party of Rights; leaders of the Dalmatian branch of the party called for resignation of honorary president Anto Đapić. The president of the HSP in Split, Hrvoje Tomašević, asked for Đapić's resignation from politics and election in the party. He was supported by the president of the HSP in Dubrovnik, Denis Šešelj.
This appeal resulted in Đapić's resignation from party politics.

On 28 January 2013, the Presidency of the Croatian Party of Rights expelled its former honorary president Đapić from the party. Srb, the party's president, said that Đapić expelled as he broke his promise that he wouldn't be active in politics. Đapić said that he was shocked by the decision.

Election history

Legislative
The following is a summary of the party's results in legislative elections for the Croatian Parliament. The "Total votes" and "Percentage" columns include sums of votes won by pre-election coalitions HSP had been part of and the "Total seats" column includes sums of seats won by HSP in election constituencies plus representatives of ethnic minorities affiliated with HSP.

Presidential
The following is a list of presidential candidates endorsed by HSP in elections for President of Croatia.

European Parliament

See also
 Croatian Party of Rights of Bosnia and Herzegovina, the sister party in Bosnia and Herzegovina

References

Bibliography

External links
HSP Zagreb
HSP/HOS flags and symbols

1990 establishments in Croatia
Anti-Serbian sentiment
Conservative parties in Croatia
Croatian nationalist parties
Euronat members
Eurosceptic parties in Croatia
Far-right politics in Croatia
National conservative parties
Nationalist parties in Croatia
Political parties established in 1990
Right-wing populism in Croatia
Social conservative parties